Knut Gerschau (born 3 July 1961) is a German politician for the FDP and since 2021 member of the Bundestag, the federal diet. He is a past chairman of the board of the German Foundation for World Population (DSW) and state chairman of the Liberaler Mittelstand Lower Saxony.

Career
Gerschau was born 1963 in the West German city of Bremen and grew up in Bremerhaven and, following his move to Wilhelmshaven, later earned his Abitur in Bremen. After completing his military service in Bremen and Schleswig-Holstein, Gerschau moved to Hanover.

In 1984 Knut Gerschau and Robert Kroth founded the Gerschau.Kroth.Werbeagentur. GmbH (now LEADS-Marketing) in Hanover. He has been their managing partner since the company was founded.

Social and political commitment
Knut Gerschau, a member of the 16th Federal Assembly participated in the election of the German Federal President on 12 February 2017, 

He also holds several honorary offices:
 Board member of the German Foundation for World Population (DSW) from 2010 to 2019.
 Member of the Board of Trustees of the Rudolf von Bennigsen Foundation
 Chairman of the Society of Friends of the Rudolf-von-Bennigsen-Foundation e. V.
 State chairman of the Liberaler Mittelstand Niedersachsen e. V. (Liberal Middle Classes of Lower Saxony).

Gerschau is involved in Hanover in the district foundation Sahlkamp-Vahrenheide.

In 2021 he was elected as a member of the Bundestag.

Private
Knut Gerschau is single and father of two children.

See also
 List of members of the 20th Bundestag
 2021 German federal election

References

External links

 Biography at the German Bundestag

Living people
1961 births
Free Democratic Party (Germany) politicians
Members of the Bundestag 2021–2025
21st-century German politicians